Persoonia cuspidifera is a species of flowering plant in the family Proteaceae and is endemic to northern New South Wales. It is an erect shrub with spatula-shaped leaves and greenish yellow, tube-shaped flowers in groups of up to twenty-five.

Description
Flowering occurs between November and March and the fruit is a green drupe with purple stripes.

Taxonomy
Persoonia cuspidifera was first formally described in 1991 by Lawrie Johnson and Peter Weston in the journal Telopea from specimens collected near the junction of the Newell and Oxley Highways in 1990.

Distribution and habitat
This geebung grows in the heathy and scrubby understorey of forest in the Pilliga Scrub and the foothills of the Warrumbungles in northern New South Wales.

References

Flora of New South Wales
cuspidifera
Plants described in 1991
Taxa named by Lawrence Alexander Sidney Johnson
Taxa named by Peter H. Weston